Marciano Bruma (born as Marciano van Homoet on 7 March 1984) is a Dutch professional footballer who plays as a defender for Derde Klasse club .

Club career

Barnsley 
Van Homoet was signed by Barnsley on 8 June 2007. He was originally known as Bruma, but was forced to change his name in September 2007, by the FA when Barnsley sent in his registration, after he completed a successful trial period with them at the start of the season.

When he broke his hand he had a plate screwed onto his second metacarpal in an hour-long surgery, the plate is a permanent attachment and can not be removed.

After breaking a bone in his hand during pre-season, Van Homoet made his Barnsley debut in December 2007 against Sheffield United.

During his first season at Oakwell, he played as a substitute in the memorable win over Premier League side Liverpool in the 2007-08 FA Cup. He then excelled in the subsequent quarter-final victory against Chelsea and also played at Wembley in the Semi-Final against Cardiff City.

His second season with the Oakwell outfit did not get off to a very good start; getting himself sent off in the first match of the 2008/09 season vs Queens Park Rangers.

Willem II 
He was released in July 2009 when his contract expired. He then signed a deal with Dutch side Willem II.

Arka Gdynia 
He signed a two-year contract with Polish club Arka Gdynia on 9 July 2010. He was released from Arka Gdynia on 30 June 2011.

Lech Poznań 
On 18 August 2011 Bruma signed a one-year contract with Polish side Lech Poznań, only to leave them after one year for Dutch amateur side Rijnsburgse Boys.

He was snapped up by Excelsior Maassluis in summer 2014 and left them for Hoofdklasse club XerxesDZB in 2016.

Personal life 
Marciano is the older brother of VfL Wolfsburg player Jeffrey Bruma.

He had always been known as Marciano Bruma in the Netherlands, after dropping his father’s surname as a young child when his parents split up. But the FA insisted he should use the name on his birth certificate, so in England he played as Marciano van Homoet

References

External links
 
 Marciano van Homoet profile at barnsleyfc.co.uk
 

1984 births
Living people
Footballers from Rotterdam
Dutch sportspeople of Surinamese descent
Association football defenders
Dutch footballers
Dutch expatriate footballers
Expatriate footballers in England
Expatriate footballers in Poland
Dutch expatriate sportspeople in England
Dutch expatriate sportspeople in Poland
Sparta Rotterdam players
Barnsley F.C. players
Willem II (football club) players
Arka Gdynia players
Lech Poznań players
Rijnsburgse Boys players
Excelsior Maassluis players
Eredivisie players
English Football League players
Ekstraklasa players
Derde Divisie players